Vodny (Vodnöj) is an urban locality (an urban-type settlement) under the administrative jurisdiction of the town of republic significance of Ukhta in the Komi Republic, Russia. As of the 2010 Census, its population was 6,382.

History
Urban-type settlement status was granted to Vodny in 1944.

Administrative and municipal status
Within the framework of administrative divisions, the urban-type settlement of Vodny, together with two rural localities, is incorporated as Vodny Urban-Type Settlement Administrative Territory, which is subordinated to the town of republic significance of Ukhta. Within the framework of municipal divisions, Vodny is a part of Ukhta Urban Okrug.

References

Notes

Sources

Urban-type settlements in the Komi Republic